Event 2 is the second album by hip hop supergroup Deltron 3030. The album was released on September 30, 2013. It is the group's first album since their 2000 debut, Deltron 3030 and a narrative sequel.

Production history
Production began in 2004, but was fraught with delays. According to Kid Koala's website, he finished the turntable portions of the album in May 2006. In October 2006 Dan the Automator predicted completion by December 2006, and in November of the same year, Del told IGN that four songs were already written and that "the album's lyrical theme has been basically mapped out." Later, in March 2008, Del told the News-Observer that "Kid Koala and Automator already finished the production. It's done. So, it's just up to me to write [the lyrics]." During an episode of XM Radio's Subsoniq show in April 2008, Del was asked about the progress of the album. He said that he had already written six songs, and that the album should be completed before long.

In an August 2010 interview with Melancholy Native blogger Triassic, Del commented that the album was "just about finished, actually." Del issued several updates in interviews throughout 2011.

On June 12, 2012, it was announced by Dan the Automator that the album was finished with "small touchups" and would likely be released in September 2012.

Promotion
On February 2, 2012, Dogfish Head Brewery updated their blog with information about the Positive Contact box set containing a special edition beer brewed to Dan the Automator's specifications, several recipes from renowned chefs, and a 10" vinyl record with exclusive hip hop dub remixes of four tracks from new album, at that point scheduled to be released in May 2012. The 10" vinyl was later sold separately.

The album's first single was "City Rising From the Ashes," influenced by the story of Osiris.

On September 23, 2013, Event 2 was put on Pitchfork's Advance Streaming service in its entirety, one week before its official release.

Commercial performance
The album debuted at number 41 on the US Billboard 200 chart, with first-week sales of 8,000 copies in the United States.

Track listing

References 

Deltron 3030 albums
Albums produced by Dan the Automator
Concept albums
Rap operas
2013 albums
Sequel albums